The College of Agriculture Vellanikkara, is the premier and a constituent college of Kerala Agricultural University, situated in Thrissur of Kerala state in India. The College of Agriculture imparts agricultural education at undergraduate, graduate and doctoral levels. The college has 21 departments, 11 All India Coordinated Research Projects and 11 centres undertaking the multiple activities of teaching, research and extension. The college is located in the picturesque central campus of Kerala Agricultural University where the college and its departments itself spans the whole central campus in Vellanikkara, Thrissur. The only college under KAU which received the Sardar Patel Outstanding Institution Award more than 9 times consecutively which is awarded by the Indian Council of Agricultural Research, for the institution's efficiency in contributing most number of Top ranks in JRF and SRF All India Entrance Examinations. The IPR cell under this college plays a major role in establishing and promoting the GI tags for products and services of the state. Agri Business Incubator functioning under the college is one of the prosperous and promising avenue for rising entrepreneurs of the state. The college was the first college to be awarded  'The Best College Award' by Kerala Agricultural University. College of Agriculture Vellanikkara is the only college under the university to win the intercollegiate Golden Lady Arts Trophy consecutively for about a decade. Dr. Mani Chellappan. Professor and Head, Department of Agricultural Entomology, CoA Vellanikkara,  is the current Dean of the college

History
The College of Horticulture was established in 1972 with the main objective of starting graduate programme in Horticulture and strengthening research and extension activities in Horticultural crops. B.Sc. (Hort.) degree programme was started with an intake of 20 students during 1972. The intake capacity was increased to 30 from 1976 and then to 40 from 1979. The B.Sc.(Ag.) programme was also introduced from 1977 with an intake of 50 students. The syllabi for the B.Sc. (Hort.) and B.Sc. (Ag.) programme were then integrated and the B.Sc. (Ag) programme alone was continued with the integrated syllabus. The intake capacity for the B.Sc. (Ag.) programme was subsequently raised to 75 and then to 90. Post graduate programme was started in six disciplines from 1976 viz., M.Sc. (Hort.), M.Sc. (Ag.) in Agronomy, Agricultural Botany, Soil Science & Agrl. Chemistry, Agrl. Entomology and Plant Pathology.

From 1979, Ph.D. programmes in the above disciplines were commenced. Subsequently, M.Sc. programmes were also started in Agrl. Economics, Agrl. Extension, Agrl. Meteorology, Agrl. Statistics and Home Science (Food Science and Nutrition). Two post-graduate diploma courses of one-year duration were conducted in Natural Rubber Production and Land Water Resources and Management from 1979 and 1980 respectively and subsequently discontinued. Under the Manpower Development Scheme sponsored by the Coffee Board of India, the final year B.Sc. (Ag.) students were given special training in coffee cultivation and processing from 1984 to 1997.

A new diploma course of two-year duration in Natural Rubber Production was started in 1998 for the sponsored candidates from Tripura with the financial assistance of the Rubber Board, Kottayam. The required Infrastructure for imparting practical training has been established. In addition to the Instructional Farm having an area of 95.35 ha, the different departments have established farms of their own in a total area of about 72.24 ha. Most of the tropical annual, perennial and plantation crops are grown in these farms. The undergraduates are given training in the cultivation of various annual crops, maintenance of perennial crops and processing of agricultural and horticultural produces through various work experience courses.

In addition to the regular field trips to various places within the state as part of practical training, the students of the second and third year B.Sc. (Ag) classes are taken on study tour to places of agricultural importance all over South India and all over the country, respectively. During the eighth semester, the final year students are attached to Krishi Bhavans and Agricultural Research Stations of the state for specific periods as a part of their field Training Programme (RAWE). The Dean heads the college. The faculty consists of nearly 130 highly qualified teachers specialised in various branches of agricultural sciences.

The name College of Horticulture Vellanikkara was renamed to College of Agriculture Vellanikkara in 2020 through ICAR recommendation followed by the Kerala Agricultural University academic council decision. Present intake of Bsc. (Hons.) Agriculture programme is 100+9(EWS).

Departments
Department of Agronomy 
Department of Agricultural Meteorology 
Department of Soil Science and Agricultural Chemistry 
Department of Agricultural Microbiology 
Department of Plant Breeding & Genetics 
Department of Agricultural Entomology 
Department of Plant Pathology 
Department of Agricultural Economics 
Department of Agricultural Extension 
Department of Agricultural Statistics 
Department of Fruit Science
Department of Vegetable Science
Department of Plantation, spices , aromatic, medicinal and aromatic crops.
Department of Post Harvest and Processing Technology 
Department of Seed science and Technology
Department of Agricultural Engineering 
Department of Community Science
Department of Physical Education 
Department of Floriculture and Landscape architecture
Department of Plant Physiology
Department of Biotechnology

Following are the Hostels of the college:

Pampa Men's Hostel
Scholar's Hostel
Harsha Ladies Hostel
Haritha Ladies Hostel
Hrithika Ladies Hostel
Hridhya Scholar's Hostel 

Following are the centers in the college:

Agri Business Incubator (ABI)
Center for Gender Concerns in Agriculture
Center for Plant Biotechnology & Molecular Biology 
Center for e-learning
Center for Land Resources Management
Radio Tracer Lab
Cadbury-KAU Cocoa Project
Center for Bioinformatics 
Instructional Farm
Agricultural Technology Information Centre
Dr. T V Vishwanathan Memorial Herbal Garden

References

Agricultural universities and colleges in Kerala
Colleges in Thrissur
Colleges affiliated to Kerala Agricultural University
Agricultural research stations in Kerala
Educational institutions established in 1972
Horticultural organisations based in India
1972 establishments in Kerala